Lampanyctus nobilis, the noble lampfish, is a species of lanternfish.

References

noble lampfish
Pantropical fish
noble lampfish
Taxa named by Åge Vedel Tåning